Antonio "Tony" Bonezzi (30 November 1931 – 1 January 1967) was a footballer. Born in Argentina, he played international football for both the United States and Israel.

Playing career 
He played as a midfielder for Colombo and Beitar Tel Aviv. In 1959, he played in the National Soccer League with Montreal Alouettes. In 1962, he played in the American Soccer League with Ukrainian Nationals. For the remainder of 1962, he played in the Eastern Canada Professional Soccer League with the Buffalo White Eagles. Midway through the season, he was traded to league rivals Toronto Italia.

References

1931 births
1967 deaths
Argentine footballers
Argentine expatriate footballers
American soccer players
United States men's international soccer players
Israeli footballers
Israel international footballers
Dual internationalists (football)
Colombo players
Beitar Tel Aviv F.C. players
Association football midfielders
Canadian National Soccer League players
People from La Pampa Province
Toronto Italia players
Eastern Canada Professional Soccer League players
Philadelphia Ukrainian Nationals players
American Soccer League (1933–1983) players